The Guozigou Bridge or Talki Bridge (تەلكى كۆۋرۈكى, Талки Коврук) is a cable stayed bridge with a main span of . The bridge was opened in 2011 and forms part of G30 Lianyungang–Khorgas Expressway in Huocheng County, Xinjiang. The bridge and associated spiral allow for navigatable gradients.

See also
List of tallest bridges in the world
List of highest bridges in the world

External links
http://highestbridges.com/wiki/index.php?title=Guozigou_Bridge

Cable-stayed bridges in China
Bridges completed in 2011
Buildings and structures in Xinjiang